Thomas Alcock (1801 – 1866) was a British Member of Parliament for 24 years non-consecutively, a progressive Liberal on questions of expansion of the popular ballot he was also an established church benefactor.

Alcock was born in Putney, son of Joseph Alcock of Roehampton then in the same parish. His father, a clerk at the Treasury, was a nephew of Sir Joseph Mawbey. Thomas siblings included Maria, who was married to the Reverend Brymer Belcher, and Letitia who married Charles Parke of Henbury in Dorset. Two brothers, Joseph and John predeceased him. He was schooled at Harrow and served briefly in the 1st Dragoon Guards. In 1828-9 he travelled in Russia, Turkey, Persia and Greece, and later had an account of his travels privately printed.

He was a Member of Parliament (MP) for the rotten borough of Newton, Lancashire between 1826 and 1830, and after the Great Reform Act, sat for Ludlow, Shropshire from 1839 to 1840, and having lost elections such as the 1841 East Surrey by-election served that seat from 1847 to 1865. He was appointed High Sheriff of Surrey for 1837.

Alcock was politically progressive and in favour of extending the franchise. He spent more than £40,000 on building churches, parsonages and schools, and the endowment of churches, in Surrey and Lincolnshire. He was a strong advocate for the preservation of commons and open spaces for the use and recreation of the public, and published a pamphlet on the subject in 1845.

He was also responsible for extensively remodelling the mansion of Kingswood Warren in Surrey, to the designs of the architect T.R. Knowles.  He died on 22 August 1866 at Great Malvern, Worcestershire.  His probate was resworn May 1892, under £90,000, implying he left at least .

References

External links 

 

1801 births
1866 deaths
UK MPs 1837–1841
UK MPs 1847–1852
UK MPs 1852–1857
UK MPs 1857–1859
UK MPs 1859–1865
Members of the Parliament of the United Kingdom for constituencies in Shropshire
High Sheriffs of Surrey
People educated at Harrow School